The Lichte (Thuringia) east station was a Deutsche Reichsbahn station of the Thuringian municipality of Lichte (Wallendorf) in the district of Saalfeld-Rudolstadt.

This now-defunct station is located on an altitude of 618.54 m above NN. There are two platforms, three transit tracks, one street connection, one cargo street, one deposit track, and one track to the goods shed.

Lichte (Thuringia) east station was also an express train station on the railway line from Sonneberg to Probstzella.

History 
This train station was opened in January, 16th  1899. The first name was Bock-Wallendorf. It was the new final destination of the railway line from Probstzella to Schmiedefeld (Lichtetal). Only much later, in October, 31st 1913 this terminal station was enhanced to an express railway station, as the railway line from Probstzella was extended to Lauscha, and Sonneberg. However, with the reduction of goods to be dispatched to, respective exchanged with, the municipality of Lichte and the town Neuhaus am Rennweg, Lichte (Thuringia) east station became less important.

In 1963 the piece-goods and parcels dispatch was closed. And in the 1980s the station lost even more importance, because the number of steam locomotives used was declining and finally ceased, and as a result the local water filling station for steam locomotives was closed.

Further on the train station was unmanned. However, there was a stop for the semi-fast trains from Sonneberg to Leipzig, in distinction to the Lichte (Thuringia) station next to it.

Because of technical deficits the train service was ceased by surprise on 22 January 1997. On 1 July 2006 the German Eisenbahnbundesamt agreed to the discontinuance of the train service.

In the meanwhile the Deutsche Regionaleisenbahn rent this rail line. Since 2008 tourist service by usage of rail-cycle draisines on the rail line from Schmiedefeld (Lichtetal) via Lichte (Thuringia) east station to Lichte (Thuringia) station has been established. The highlight of a draisine tour is the crossing of the Viaduct Hammerwiesen in Lichte (Wallendorf), close to the Lichte (Thuringia) east station.

See also
Lichte (Thuringia) station

References

Wolfgang Beyer, Emil Ehle: Über den Rennsteig - Von Sonneberg nach Probstzella. Transpress Verlag, Berlin 1983,

External links 
History by Lothar Brill.de
Imiges stations and line.de
Railway time-table (de:Kursbuch) from 1944.de
Short information of Lichte.de

See also
 Cultural monuments in Lichte

Railway stations in Thuringia
Lichte
Buildings and structures in Saalfeld-Rudolstadt
Railway stations in Germany opened in 1899
Railway stations closed in 1997